Vultureni is a commune in Cluj County, Transylvania, Romania. It is composed of six villages: Băbuțiu (Báboc), Bădești (Bádok), Chidea (Kide), Făureni (Kolozskovácsi), Șoimeni (Sólyomkő), and Vultureni.

Demographics
According to the census from 2002 there was a total population of 1,568 people living in this commune. Of this population, 84.69% are ethnic Romanians, 11.73% are ethnic Hungarians and 3.50% ethnic Romani.

Natives
András Kovács
Jacob Salomon

References

Communes in Cluj County
Localities in Transylvania